Nicolas Jean Ernault de Rignac des Bruslys (7 August 1757 – 25 September 1809) was a French general and governor of Île Bonaparte.

Biography

Early career 
Des Bruslys joined the École des Mineurs in Verdun on September 28, 1774. After the school closed the following year, he joined an elite cavalry unit, the Gardes du Corps du Roi (bodyguards of the king). He received a commission of second lieutenant in the 3rd Artillery regiment in July 1780.

In 1781, des Bruslys took part in an attempt to invade India. He was promoted to first lieutenant in September 1783 and to captain of the Colonial troops on 7 May 1786. He took part in a diplomatic mission to Persia before returning to France in 1787.

From January 1788, he served as aide to the inspector of the artillery. In September, he was promoted to lieutenant-colonel. On September 14, he distinguished himself at La Croix-aux-Bois, reforming disbanded battalions and disbanding four battalions which were threatened with encirclement. On the following day, he saved the supplies of his army which were being attacked by three squadrons.

On 8 October 1789, he was promoted to Adjudant-général-colonel, and took part in the siege of Namur, personally leading the capture of the fort of Vilatte. On 26 November he was wounded by shrapnel in the right arm.

French revolution 
From 26 January 1793, he led the siege at Maastricht where he was wounded on 27 February 1794 by a cannonball in the right leg.

On 7 August 1794, des Bruslys was promoted to acting Général de brigade and served as de facto chief of staff of the armies of the North, of Belgium and of Ardennes. His rank was confirmed on 13 May, but revoked on 10 August and he was arrested shortly thereafter following suspicions raised by the defection of his brothers in 1791. He was released at the Thermidorian Reaction, on 9 Thermidor Year II (27 July 1794). On 22 Thermidor (9 August), he was again arrested as former head of staff of Custine. He was freed on 19 Frimaire an III (9 December 1794) and dispatched to the West Army.

Des Bruslys was soon called back to Paris, and defended the Convention nationale during the Prairial uprising.

On 26 Germinal (15 April 1795), he was sent to the Army of the North. From 25 Pluviôse an V (13 February 1797), he was in charge of defending the coast.

On 28 Messidor an VI (16 July 1798), he was sent to the Army of England, which he quit to take back his previous position on 21 Nivôse an VII (10 January 1799). He was seconded to the Army of the Rhine on 26 Frimaire an VIII (17 December 1799), where he distinguished himself at Fribourg and Biberach an der Riß. He served under Jean Victor Marie Moreau at Ulm and defended St. Gotthard Pass.

In Vendémiaire an X (October 1801), he took command of the Souham division, before being put at the disposal of the Ministry of the Navy. On 25 Nivôse (15 January 1802), he was sent to Rochefort, embarked aboard the frigate Thêmis and sailed to Île de France (now Mauritius), under François-Louis Magallon. He married there.

When Magallon was sent back to France, Decaen appointed des Bruslys governor of Réunion. On 4 Germinal an XII (25 March 1804), he received the Legion of Honour, and on 13 July 1808, he was promoted to Général de division.

First French Empire 
Decaen had thought that the British would attempt a raid at Saint Paul. Des Bruslys both did not share the conviction and was reluctant to weaken the defences of Saint-Denis, thinking that his forces did not allow him effectively to defend the entire coastline.

The British raided Saint Paul on 21 September 1809. Unable to hold their position, the French retreated to a position near the gunpowder store. Corbett himself showed up with an ultimatum threatening to set the entire city on fire, should the French attack.

On the next day, des Bruslys led his force of 50 soldiers and 800 militiamen of the National Guard to counter the British, and found himself facing a 900-man strong expeditionary force already settled in Saint Paul. Des Bruslys hesitated between launching a direct assault and building a defensive line to contain the British. In the evening, he retreated to Saint-Denis in order to organise its defense against a potential invasion, leaving Captain Saint-Michel to negotiate with the British.

On 23 September, des Bruslys refused to sign the capitulation act written in Saint Paul. General Soleille then threatened him with the decree of 14 Pluviôse an II (2 February 1794), which made "cowardice on the battlefield" punishable by the death penalty, should he not order an assault. Since he wanted neither to surrender nor to order an assault which he deemed would have ended up in a needless bloodbath, he redacted a note stating:

Bruslys then attempted to kill himself with his sabre, but failed. He then tried to blow his head off by detonating two sacks of gunpowder tied to his neck, but the powder failed to explode properly and left him severely burned. He eventually slit his carotid with his razor, successfully killing himself.

His widow obtained a 1000-franc pension in 1811.

References 

 Charles Mullié, Biographie des célébrités militaires des armées de terre et de mer de 1789 à 1850, 1852.
 Général de division DES BRUSLYS

1757 births
1809 deaths
People from Brive-la-Gaillarde
Suicides by firearm in France
French generals
French military personnel who committed suicide
French military personnel of the French Revolutionary Wars
French military personnel of the Napoleonic Wars
Chevaliers of the Légion d'honneur
Governors of Réunion
Suicides by sharp instrument in France